The 2013–14 Liga Femenina de Baloncesto was the 51st edition of the Spanish premier women's basketball championship. Regular season started on 12 October 2013 and finished on 29 March. Playoffs began on 5 April with the semifinals, concluding in late April with Finals. Top four teams will play the championship playoffs during April. Twelve teams took part in the regular season.

Rivas Ecópolis won its first title after defeating Perfumerías Avenida 2–0 in the Final of the Championship playoff.

Competition format 
The first three qualified teams after the first half of the season and the host one will play the Copa de la Reina. If the host team finishes in the top three, the fourth qualified will join the competition.

After the Regular Season, the top four teams play the play-offs, featuring semi-finals and Finals.

2013–14 season teams

Regular season table

Playoffs 

All times are CEST, except for Canary Islands which is WEST.

Semifinals

(1) Perfumerías Avenida vs. (4) Embutidos Pajariel Bembibre

(2) Rivas Ecópolis vs. (3) Gran Canaria 2014

Final

(1) Perfumerías Avenida vs. (2) Rivas Ecópolis

Stats leaders in regular season

Points

Rebounds

Assists

Performance Index Rating

References

External links 
 Official website

Liga Femenina de Baloncesto seasons
Femenina
Spain
Liga